Checheng Road Subdistrict is a subdistrict of Zhangwan District, Shiyan, Hubei. The subdistrict has a population of 79,315 as of 2019.

Checheng Road is highly developed with many automobile factories owned by Dongfeng Motor Corporation.

It was the location of the 2021 Shiyan pipeline explosion.

Administrative divisions 
Checheng Road Subdistrict includes 12 the following residential communities and 1 administrative village.

 Yanhu Community (formerly Sanchahe Village)
 Jingtan Community (formerly Youfangyuan Village)
 Kangle Community
 Zhangwan Community (formerly Haojia Village)
 Gaojiawan Community
 People’s Square Community
 Gongyixincun Community
 Gongyuan Community
 Checheng West Road Community
 Dongyuegutai Community
 Yanling Community
 Lanshanjun Community
 Xiejia Village

References 

Zhangwan District
Township-level divisions of Hubei